Gravitation: Variation in Time and Space is a 2015 black & white art film, written and produced by Rem Hass and directed by  Andrei Severny. 
Gravitation is a synergy of dance, cinema and abstract art and stars Diana Vishneva, principal dancer of the Mariinsky Ballet and the American Ballet Theatre. The movements were choreographed by Mauro Bigonzetti specifically for the film. The work was shot entirely in slow motion with Phantom Flex4K cameras in 500-1,000 frames-per-second. The film was shot on location at the Alvin Ailey American Dance Theater in New York City.

Gravitation premiered at the Marfa Film Festival in October 2015. It received a Golden Palm Award at the Mexico International Film Festival and a Rising Star Award at the Canada International Film Festival. It was selected by NASA as a finalist at the CineSpace program at the Houston Cinema Arts Festival and screened at the Museum of Fine Arts Houston and screened in Moscow,  London, Rome, Santander, Napa, Martinique.

Synopsis 

The film is a story of creation, inner struggle and transformation. Calligraphic black and white images are rich in metaphors exploring the notions of time and space, movement and light. The film is divided in chapters: Birth, Desire, Clash, Despair, Gravitation.

The director Andrei Severny said about the film: “We tried to show the ballerina’s movement like you’ve never seen it before. Powerful back lighting and slow motion focuses viewer’s attention on the calligraphic perfection of the lines and guides into unusual visual world. The shots of the moon and space from the NASA archives become metaphors of loneliness and eternity of space and make us reconsider the whole notion of time.”

References

External links 
 Official website
 

2015 films
Films directed by Andrei Severny (filmmaker)
Films shot in New York City
2010s dance films
American dance films
2010s English-language films
2010s American films